Satyanweshi also spelled Satyanveshi, (Lit: The Truth Seeker) is a detective story written by Sharadindu Bandyopadhyay featuring the Bengali detective Byomkesh Bakshi and his friend, assistant, and narrator Ajit Bandyopadhyay. It is the first Byomkesh adventure written by Sharadindu Bandyopadhyay.

Plot
Ajit Bandyopadhyay lives in a hostel, along with some other people. Ashwini Babu and Ghanshyam Babu are two of the hostel inmates; they live next to Ajit. The hostel is run by a philanthropic homeopathic doctor, Anukul Babu. Ajit has recently become aware of some murders that have happened in their locality. They seemed to have been done by the same person, possibly a serial killer.

One morning a young man named Atul Chandra Mitra comes to Anukul Babu, looking for a vacant room in the hostel. Anukul Babu informs him that there is no vacant room currently available in the hostel. Ajit was sitting nearby and offered to share his room with Atul. Atul is gratified. He even offers to pay the entire rent which Ajit accepts.

One night Ashwini Babu is murdered and Atul gets arrested. But after sometime he is released, without any explanation. That night the murderer of Ashwini Babu tries to kill Atul and Ajit, but he fails. The real killer gets arrested, who is Anukul Babu. He has been doing the business of cocaine behind homeopathy. Ashwini Babu came upon the secret and thus had to be killed.

After that, it is revealed to Ajit that Atul Chandra Mitra is really Byomkesh Bakshi who has assumed an alias to know the truth behind the chain of murders. Byomkesh takes Ajit to his home and they begin living together in the former's house with a servant, Punti Ram.

Characters
 Byomkesh Bakshi (Atul Chandra Mitra) 
 Ajit Kumar Bandopadhyay
 Punti Ram
 Dr. Anukul Babu
 Ashwini Kumar Chodhury 
 Ghanshyam Babu
 Police Commissioner 
Servant
Inspector

Adaptations

Radio
 The Sunday Suspense series of 98.3 Radio Mirchi (Kolkata) adapted this novel as radio drama, voiced by Mir Afsar Ali, RJ Deep and Richard.

Television
 This was one of the stories of 1993 TV series Byomkesh Bakshi, that were recreated for broadcasting on Doordarshan, the Indian National Network, by Basu Chatterjee, and immediately went on to become one of the most memorable episodes.
 The story adapted into another TV series in 2014 named Byomkesh, which aired on Bengali channel ETV Bangla.

Film
 2015 Hindi language film Detective Byomkesh Bakshy! is mainly based on this story.

References

External links
Byomkesh Quiz 1 – Satyanveshi (সত্যান্বেষী)

1934 short stories
Detective fiction short stories
Indian Bengali-language novels
Indian mystery novels
Culture of Kolkata
Byomkesh Bakshi